Kindama is a rishi featured in the Hindu epic Mahabharata.

Legend 
Once, the sage and his wife were mating in the form of a deer and a doe. King Pandu of Hastinapura, who had been hunting there, shot them, mistaking them for deer, mortally injuring them. Enraged, Kindama assumed his true form, and berated the king for having killed him before he had finished the act of mating. Before dying, Kindama cursed Pandu that he would die the moment he touched his wife with the intention of making love.

Citations

Rishis
 Characters in the Mahabharata
 Shapeshifting
 Talking animals in mythology
 Curses
 Mythological deer